National Route 389 is a national highway of Japan on the island of Kyushu, connecting Ōmuta, Fukuoka and Akune, Kagoshima in Japan, with a total length of 155.4 km (96.56 mi).

References

389
Roads in Fukuoka Prefecture
Roads in Kagoshima Prefecture
Roads in Kumamoto Prefecture
Roads in Nagasaki Prefecture